Mona Bollerud born 1968 in Fiskum in Øvre Eiker is a former Norwegian biathlete. She participated on the Norwegian team that received a silver medal in the 3 × 5 km relay in the 1988 Biathlon World Championships. She received a silver medal in the team event in 1989.

References

External links

Living people
Norwegian female biathletes
Biathlon World Championships medalists
People from Øvre Eiker
Year of birth missing (living people)
Sportspeople from Viken (county)
20th-century Norwegian women